Jinbo Yukiko (神保 雪子, 1845-October 10, 1868) was a Japanese noble lady, member of the aristocracy, Onna-musha (female warrior) and retainer of the Aizu-Matsudaira clan who lived during the late Edo period. She is best known for having participated in the Boshin war; Yukiko joined the Jōshitai (娘子 隊, Girls' Army) during the Battle of Aizu.

Life 
Jinbo Yukiko was born in the Inoue clan, powerful retainers of the Aizu clan. Known for her martial skills, beauty and moral character, Yukiko married Jinbo Shuri, son of Jinbo Kuranosuke who was a Karō (top-ranking official samurai). At that time, samurai weddings were only of a political nature, Yukiko's marital relationship with her husband was envied by the people around her.

Popular culture 

 Byakkotai: NTV year-end drama special in 1986 (actress: Kimiko Ikegami)

 Yae no Sakura: 2013 NHK Taiga Drama (actress: Ashina Hoshi）

Bibliography 

 歴史にも驚くべきスクープがある 『幕末会津の女たち、男たち　山本八重よ銃をとれ』 （中村彰彦 著）（本の話web） - 2016年1月20日閲覧。
1868 deaths
1845 births
People of the Boshin War
Aizu-Matsudaira retainers
Women in 19th-century warfare
Japanese women in warfare
1860s suicides